Captain Spaulding (born Johnny Lee Johns and also known as "Cutter") is a fictional character created by Rob Zombie. The character first appeared in Zombie's 2003 horror film House of 1000 Corpses, portrayed by Sid Haig. Haig reprised his role as Spaulding in the sequels The Devil's Rejects (2005) and 3 from Hell (2019). Haig also voiced Spaulding in the 2009 animated film The Haunted World of El Superbeasto. The character is depicted as a vulgar and murderous clown.

In House of 1000 Corpses, Spaulding is portrayed as the proprietor of a gas station and fried chicken eatery that also houses a roadside attraction known as Captain Spaulding's Museum of Monsters and Madmen. In The Devil's Rejects, he is revealed to be the patriarch of the Firefly family. The character, and Haig himself, have been called icons of modern horror cinema.

Fictional character biography
Captain Spaulding has a lengthy criminal history, and earned the nickname "Cutter" for stabbing a man to death. Spaulding met Eve Wilson, also known as Mama Firefly, in 1947, and they had a daughter named Vera-Ellen (also known as Baby Firefly). Years later, Spaulding met Otis B. Driftwood and invited him to become a member of their family.

In House of 1000 Corpses, Spaulding is portrayed as the proprietor of a gas station in Texas that also sells fried chicken. The establishment also harbors a roadside haunted house attraction known as Captain Spaulding's Museum of Monsters and Madmen. At the beginning of the film, the establishment is targeted by robbers, whom Spaulding kills. Later in the film, when a group of four people visit his establishment and learn of the local legend of Dr. Satan, Spaulding directs them in the path of the murderous Firefly family. Spaulding's ties to the Firefly clan are kept ambiguous throughout most of the film.

In The Devil's Rejects, Spaulding is revealed to be the patriarch of the Firefly family. In the film's opening sequence, Mama Firefly is taken into custody when the Firefly home is subjected to a search and destroy mission by Sheriff John Wydell and a number of state troopers, but Spaulding is elsewhere during the raid. In prison, Wydell stabs Mama Firefly to death as revenge for the murder of his brother George Wydell, whom she fatally shot in the previous film. Spaulding, Otis, and Baby are eventually captured by Wydell and brought to the Firefly house, where Wydell tortures them. Wydell sets the house on fire and leaves Otis and Spaulding to die, while he hunts Baby for sport outside. Tiny, another member of the Firefly clan, intervenes, killing Wydell and saving the trio. Spaulding, Otis, and Baby escape in a 1972 Cadillac Eldorado belonging to Spaulding's half-brother Charlie Altamont, and are shot by authorities while speeding towards a police barricade.

In 3 from Hell, Spaulding, Otis, and Baby are revealed to have just barely survived the shootout with the police, and are put on trial and imprisoned shortly after their recovery. A decrepit Spaulding is executed by lethal injection sometime later, leading to Otis and Baby attempting an escape.

Development
Spaulding was originally supposed to have a bigger role in 3 from Hell, but Sid Haig's real-life health issues stopped him from completing the role as it was written, forcing Zombie to greatly reduce his role.

Concept and characteristics
In the commentary for House of 1000 Corpses, director Rob Zombie describes Spaulding as a "lovable asshole", and ensured that the character's motivations and connection to the Firefly family would be ambiguous in the film. Spaulding is described in the script for House of 1000 Corpses as a "crusty-looking old man in a filthy clown suit and smeared make-up". Just as several characters from the series are named after characters from Marx Brothers films, Spaulding is named for Groucho Marx's character Captain Jeffrey T. Spaulding from the 1930 film Animal Crackers.

Reception
Captain Spaulding has been referred to as a modern icon of horror cinema, and Haig himself has been called a "horror icon" for his portrayal of Spaulding.

In describing Spaulding for his review for The Devil's Rejects, film critic Roger Ebert wrote: "He is a man whose teeth are so bad, they're more frightening than his clown makeup. He plays such a thoroughly disgusting person, indeed, that I was driven to www.sidhaig.com to discover that in real life Sid looks, well, presentable [...] This was a relief to me, because anyone who really looked like Captain Spaulding would send shoppers screaming."

References

Further reading
 
 
 

Film characters introduced in 2003
Fictional characters from Texas
Fictional people sentenced to death
Fictional executed characters
Fictional serial killers
Fictional clowns
Male horror film villains
Firefly (film series)